Horacio Raúl Cordero Vásquez (born 22 May 1950 in Buenos Aires) is an Argentine football manager and former player.

Playing career
Cordero played for a number of clubs in Argentina including Argentinos Juniors, Racing Club, Unión de Santa Fe, Cipoletti, Deportivo Morón and Sarmiento de Junín.

He also played in Colombia for Millonarios.

Managerial career
He has spent the majority of his career coaching clubs in Central America, where he has won multiple league titles, most notably in Guatemala with CSD Municipal (4 titles) and CSD Comunicaciones (2 titles). His six championships in Guatemala are the second most by any coach behind Rubén Amorín's eight.

Cordero has also coached the Guatemala national team in 1996 and the Costa Rica national team in 1997.

External links
  La Hora
  BDFA profile
  Once-once

1950 births
Living people
Footballers from Buenos Aires
Argentine footballers
Argentinos Juniors footballers
Racing Club de Avellaneda footballers
Unión de Santa Fe footballers
Millonarios F.C. players
Club Atlético Sarmiento footballers
1997 Copa América managers
Association football midfielders
Argentine football managers
C.S.D. Municipal managers
PAS Giannina F.C. managers
Comunicaciones F.C. managers
C.D. Suchitepéquez managers
Universidad SC managers
Club Xelajú MC managers
C.D. Luis Ángel Firpo managers
Deportivo Morón footballers
Costa Rica national football team managers
Guatemala national football team managers
Argentine expatriate footballers
Argentine expatriate football managers
Expatriate footballers in Colombia
Expatriate football managers in Guatemala
Expatriate football managers in El Salvador
Expatriate football managers in Mexico
Argentine expatriate sportspeople in Colombia
Argentine expatriate sportspeople in Guatemala
Argentine expatriate sportspeople in El Salvador
Argentine expatriate sportspeople in Mexico